The Best American Short Stories 2005, a volume in The Best American Short Stories series, was edited by Katrina Kenison and by guest editor Michael Chabon.

Short Stories included

Other notable stories

Among the other notable writers whose stories were among the "100 Other Distinguished Stories of 2005" were Ann Beattie, E. L. Doctorow, Jhumpa Lahiri, Rick Moody, Gina Ochsner and John Updike.

Notes

External links
 Best American Short Stories

2005 anthologies
Fiction anthologies
Short Stories 2005
Houghton Mifflin books